Eupithecia spinibarbata is a moth in the family Geometridae. It is found in India (Darjeeling).

The wingspan is about 19 mm. The forewings are pale whitish grey.

References

Moths described in 2010
spinibarbata
Moths of Asia